is a trampoline gymnast from Japan.

Ayano competed in the women's trampoline event at the 2012 Summer Olympics where she finished in 14th place.

References

External links
 
 
 

1992 births
Living people
Japanese female trampolinists
Olympic gymnasts of Japan
Gymnasts at the 2012 Summer Olympics
Asian Games medalists in gymnastics
Asian Games bronze medalists for Japan
Gymnasts at the 2014 Asian Games
Medalists at the 2014 Asian Games
Medalists at the Trampoline Gymnastics World Championships
People from Musashino, Tokyo
Competitors at the 2009 World Games
21st-century Japanese women